Conejos, Conejitos, o Conejitos chilenos (all in plural form) are traditional Chilean pastry similar to berliner, in that they are filled with crème pâtissière (custard), but not fried. The dough is made with flour, eggs, sugar, milk, leavening, and butter. The filling (called "crema pastelera" in Spanish) is made with corn starch, egg yolks, milk, sugar, and vanilla.

See also
 List of pastries

References

External links
 How to make conejitos (step by step and with pictures, in Spanish)

Chilean cuisine
Pastries